Lower Norrland Military District (Milo NN), originally II Military District was a Swedish military district, a command of the Swedish Armed Forces that had operational control over Lower Norrland, for most time of its existence corresponding to the area covered by the counties of Västernorrland, Jämtland and the northern part of Gävleborg. The headquarters of Milo NN were located in Östersund.

History 
Milo NN was created in 1966 along with five other military districts as part of a reorganisation of the administrative divisions of the Swedish Armed Forces. It can be seen as the successor of II Military District (II. militärområdet) created in 1942, but that did not have the same tasks as Milo NN. The military district consisted of the land covered by the above-mentioned counties, and from 1982, also the southern part of Gävleborg County. In 1993, the number of military districts of Sweden was decreased to three, and as a consequence of that, Milo NN was merged with the Upper Norrland Military District (Milo ÖN) to create a new military district, the Northern Military District (Milo N).

Units 1989
In peacetime the Lower Norrland Military District consisted of the following units, which were training recruits for wartime units:

 Lower Norrland Military District (Milo NN), in Östersund
 Army units:
 I 5/Fo 22 - Jämtland Ranger Regiment / Jämtland Defense District, in Östersund
 I 14/Fo 21 - Hälsinge Regiment / Gävleborg Defense District, in Gävle
 I 21/Fo 23 - Västernorrland Regiment / Västernorrland Defense District, in Sollefteå
 A 4 - Norrland Artillery Regiment, in Östersund
 T 3 - Norrland Logistic Regiment, in Sollefteå
 Air Force units:
 F 4/Se NN - Jämtland Wing / Air Defense Sector Lower Norrland, in Östersund
 41st Fighter Squadron, with JA 37 Viggen fighter aircraft
 42nd Fighter Squadron, with JA 37 Viggen fighter aircraft
 F 15 - Hälsinge Wing, in Söderhamn under operational command of E 1 - 1st Attack Group of Milo V
 151st Attack Squadron, with AJ 37 Viggen attack aircraft
 152nd Attack Squadron, with AJ 37 Viggen attack aircraft and SK 37 two-seat trainer aircraft
 Navy units:
 MKN - Norrland Coast Naval Command, in Härnösand
 KA 5 - Härnösand Coastal Artillery Regiment, in Härnösand
 Fortress Battalion Hemsön covering the Hemsön Naval Base near Härnösand, with three twin 152mm m/51 coastal artillery guns, and two 75mm Tornpjäs m/57 batteries on Hemsön and Härnön islands 
 Fortress Battalion Holmsund covering Umeå, with one 120mm Tornautomatpjäs m/70 battery on Holmögadd and one 75mm Tornpjäs m/57 battery on Bredskär
 Fortress Battalion Gävle, with a battery of four 152mm m/98 turreted cannons and two batteries of three 75mm m/05-10 coastal canons each
 Fortress Battalion Sundsvall, with a battery of three 152mm m/98 turreted cannons, two batteries of three 75mm m/05-10 coastal canons each, and one 75mm Tornpjäs m/57 battery in Nyhamn
 Fortress Battalion Luleå, with a battery of three 152mm m/98 turreted cannons and a battery of three of 57mm m/89 rapid fire guns
 HSwMS Alnösund (14) minelayer

In wartime the Lower Norrland Military District would have activated the following major land units, as well as a host of smaller units:
 12th Division, in Östersund
 IB 14 - Gästrikeleden Brigade, in Gävle, a Type 77 infantry brigade based on the I 14 - Hälsingland Regiment
 IB 21 - Ådal Brigade, in Sollefteå, a Type 66M infantry brigade based on the I 21 - Västernorrland Regiment
 NB 35 - Field Jäger Brigade, in Östersund, a Type 85 Norrland Brigade (optimized for arctic/winter warfare) based on the I 5 - Jämtland Ranger Regiment
 IB 44 - Hälsinge Brigade, in Gävle, a Type 66M infantry brigade based on the I 14 - Hälsingland Regiment
 NB 51 - Ångermanland Brigade, in Sollefteå, a Type 85 Norrland Brigade based on the I 21 - Västernorrland Regiment

Heraldry and traditions

Coat of arms
The coat of arms of the Lower Norrland Military District Staff 1983–1993. Blazon: "Azur, an erect sword with the area letter (NN - Lower Norrland) surrounded by an open chaplet of oak leaves, all or."

Commanding officers

Military commanders

1942–1943: Helge Jung
1943–1951: Henry Tottie
1951–1960: Harald Hægermark
1960–1966: Malcolm Murray
1966–1973: Tage Olihn
1973–1978: Per Rudberg
1978–1982: Gustaf Peyron
1982–1987: Rolf Wigur
1987–1992: Major general Bengt Lönnbom
1992–1994: Lieutenant general Lars-Erik Wahlgren
1992–1993: Senior colonel Lars-Olof Strandberg

Chiefs of staff

1942–1944: Fale Burman
1944–1946: Stig af Klercker
1946–1949: Anders Hammarsjö
1949–1951: Per-Hjalmar Bauer
1951–1953: Karl Sergel
1953–1959: Lennart Lundmark
1959–1962: Atos Gordh
1962–1966: Lars-Fritiof Melin
1966–1970: Gunnar Eklund
1970–1972: Bo Varenius
1972–1974: Gustaf Peyron
1974–1978: Bengt Hallenberg
1978–1979: Jan-Henrik Torselius
1979–1981: Lennart Jedeur-Palmgren
1981–1983: Harry Winblad
1983–1989: Bertil Daggfeldt
1989–1992: Lars-Olof Strandberg
1993–1993: Vacant

Names, designations and locations

See also
Military district (Sweden)

Footnotes

References

Notes

Print

Web

Further reading

Military districts of Sweden
Disbanded units and formations of Sweden
Military units and formations established in 1942
Military units and formations disestablished in 1993
1942 establishments in Sweden
1993 disestablishments in Sweden
Östersund Garrison